Eliseo Falcón Falcón (born 11 February 1997), simply known as Eliseo, is a Spanish professional footballer who plays for Marbella FC as a central defender.

Club career
Born in Seville, Andalusia, Eliseo joined Sevilla FC's youth setup in 2012, from Calavera CF. On 2 December 2015 he signed his first professional contract, running until 2017.

Eliseo made his senior debut for the reserves on 1 May 2016, coming on as a late substitute in a 4–0 away win against UD Almería B in the Segunda División B championship. He made his professional debut on 12 November, replacing Yan Brice in a 1–0 Segunda División home win against the latter's first team.

On 10 July 2017 Eliseo moved to another reserve team, Granada CF B in the third division. On 16 July 2019, he joined fellow league team Atlético Levante UD after being sparingly used by the Nazarís.

Eliseo made his first team – and La Liga – debut on 7 December 2019, starting and being sent off in a 2–4 home loss against Valencia CF. The following 9 October, he returned to Sevilla and their B-team, still in the third tier.

References

External links

1997 births
Living people
Footballers from Seville
Spanish footballers
Association football defenders
La Liga players
Segunda División players
Segunda División B players
Tercera División players
Sevilla FC C players
Sevilla Atlético players
Club Recreativo Granada players
Atlético Levante UD players
Levante UD footballers
Marbella FC players